Juraj Laštík (born 6 March 1987) is a Slovak ski mountaineer. He became a member of the SSA national squad in 2005.

Laštík was born in Dolny Kubin. He started ski mountaineering in 2003 and competed first in the Skialpfest in 2004.

Selected results 
 2006:
 1st, Slovak Championship
 2007:
 10th, European Championship relay race (together with Jozef Hlavco, Milan Madaj and Matúš Daňko)
 2008:
 9th, World Championship relay race (together with Peter Svätojánsky, Miroslav Leitner and Jozef Hlavco)

External links 
 Juraj Laštík at skimountaineering.org

1987 births
Living people
Slovak male ski mountaineers
People from Dolný Kubín
Sportspeople from the Žilina Region